Tripura is a state in Northeast India. In 2011 the state had 3,671,032 residents, constituting 0.3% of the country's population. Native Tripuri people form about 30 per cent of Tripura's population. The Bengali people form the ethno-linguistic majority in Tripura.
The entire work of this article is based on Census of India, conducted by "The Office of the Registrar General and Census Commissioner, India" under Ministry of Home Affairs, Government of India. According to the data from the Census of 2011, there are 8 districts, 23 sub-divisions and 20 municipal towns in the state of Tripura. There is only one city in this state with a Municipal Corporation - Agartala and thirteen towns with Municipal Council as per latest data.

References

External links
 Census of India website list of Tripura towns

 
Tripura
Cities